This is a list of gene families or gene complexes, i.e. sets of genes which are related ancestrally and often serve similar biological functions. These gene families typically encode functionally related proteins, and sometimes the term gene families is a shorthand for the sets of proteins that the genes encode. They may or may not be physically adjacent on the same chromosome.

Regulatory protein gene families 

14-3-3 protein family
Achaete-scute complex (neuroblast formation)
FOX proteins (forkhead box proteins)
Families containing homeobox domains
DLX gene family
Hox gene family
POU family
 Krüppel-type zinc finger (ZNF)
 MADS-box gene family
 NOTCH2NL
P300-CBP coactivator family
SOX gene family

Immune system proteins 
Immunoglobulin superfamily
Major histocompatibility complex (MHC)

Motor proteins 
Dynein
Kinesin
Myosin

Signal transducing proteins 
 G-proteins
 MAP Kinase
Olfactory receptor
Peroxiredoxin
 Receptor tyrosine kinases

Transporters 
 ABC transporters
 Antiporter
 Aquaporins

Other families

See also 
 Protein family
 Housekeeping gene

F
Biological classification
Gene families